The Minnesota Golden Gophers women's basketball team represents the University of Minnesota in Minneapolis, Minnesota. The Golden Gophers have played in the Big Ten since the conference began sponsoring basketball in 1982. The team plays its home games in Williams Arena and is currently coached by Dawn Plitzuweit.

The Golden Gophers have made nine appearances in the NCAA Women's Division I Basketball Championship, highlighted by a Final Four appearance in 2004. The Golden Gophers also have three appearances in the AIAW women's basketball tournament.

History
The Golden Gophers have had 5 players play professional basketball, as well as eight players named All-Americans.  Four players, Lindsay Whalen, Amanda Zahui B., and Janel McCarville, Rachel Banham were selected in the top four of WNBA draft. The Gophers have ranked in the top 20 nationally in attendance for seven seasons, starting with the 2001–2002 season.

Postseason appearances

AIAW Women's Basketball Tournament appearances
The Golden Gophers appeared in the AIAW women's basketball tournament (the precursor to the modern NCAA Women's Division I Basketball Championship) three times before it was discontinued in 1982. They compiled a record of 1–3.

NCAA Division I Tournament results

The Golden Gophers have appeared in ten NCAA Division I Tournaments. They achieved their highest ranking in 2005 with a #3 seed. Their overall record is 12–10.

Head coaches
Joan Stevenson, 1971–1972 (5–3)
Deb Wilson, 1972–1973 (8–8)
Linda Wells, 1973–1974 (3–10)
Jenny Johnson, 1974–1977 (36–37)
Ellen Mosher-Hanson, 1977–1987 (172–125)
LaRue Fields, 1987–1990 (24–60)
Linda Hill-MacDonald, 1990–1997 (66–126)
Cheryl Littlejohn, 1997–2001 (29–81)
Brenda Oldfield, 2001–2002 (22–8)
Pam Borton, 2002–2014 (236–152)
Marlene Stollings, 2014–2018 (82–47)
Lindsay Whalen, 2018–2023 (71–76)
Dawn Plitzuweit, 2023–present

Year-by-year results

Conference tournament winners noted with # Source 

|-style="background: #ffffdd;"
| colspan="8" align="center" | Big Ten Conference

References

External links